Loveridge is a surname. Notable people with the surname include:

Arthur Loveridge (1891–1980), British biologist
Dave Loveridge (born 1952), New Zealand rugby player
Greg Loveridge (born 1975), New Zealand cricketer
Ivan Loveridge Bennett (1919–1990), American physician
John Loveridge (1925–2007), British Conservative MP
Ronald O. Loveridge, American politician

See also
Loveridge, West Virginia, unincorporated community
Loveridge Plantation, Leon County, Florida
Loveridge's frog (Philoria loveridgei), a frog endemic to Australia
Loveridge's sunbird (Cinnyris loveridgei), a bird endemic to Tanzania
Rana De Loveridge

English-language surnames
Surnames of British Isles origin